Avert is an unincorporated community in Stoddard County, in the U.S. state of Missouri.

History
A post office called Avert was established in 1890 and remained in operation until 1945. An early variant name was "Day", after L. B. Day, a pioneer citizen.

References

Unincorporated communities in Stoddard County, Missouri
Unincorporated communities in Missouri
1890 establishments in Missouri